Gustav Adolf Sundquist (June 4, 1879 – August 25, 1918 ) was an ordinary seaman serving in the United States Navy during the Spanish–American War who received the Medal of Honor for bravery.

Biography
Sundquist was born June 4, 1879, in Sweden and after immigrating to the United States he entered the navy. He was sent to fight in the Spanish–American War aboard the U.S.S. Nashville as an ordinary seaman.

After receiving the Medal of Honor for his actions during the Spanish–American War he retired from the navy in 1900, but rejoined it in 1918 and participated in World War I. He drowned on August 25, 1918, and has a cenotaph in Brookwood American Cemetery and Memorial (ABMC) Brookwood Surrey, England.

Medal of Honor citation
Rank and organization: Ordinary Seaman, U.S. Navy. Born: 4 June 1879, Sweden. Accredited to: New York. G.O. No.: 529, 2 November 1899.

Citation:

On board the U.S.S. Nashville during the operation of cutting the cable leading from Cienfuegos, Cuba, 11 May 1898. Facing the heavy fire of the enemy, Sundquist displayed extraordinary bravery and coolness throughout this action.

See also

 List of Medal of Honor recipients for the Spanish–American War

References

External links
 
 
 
 

1879 births
1918 deaths
United States Navy Medal of Honor recipients
United States Navy sailors
American military personnel of the Spanish–American War
Swedish emigrants to the United States
People from New York (state)
Foreign-born Medal of Honor recipients
United States Navy personnel of World War I
Spanish–American War recipients of the Medal of Honor
American military personnel killed in World War I